Mustilia glabrata is a moth in the Endromidae family. It was described by Yang in 1995. It is found in China (Guangxi).

The wingspan is 46–50 mm. The forewings are yellowish-brown with distinct dark brown maculations. The hindwings have an orange yellow costal half, while the inner half is red-brown, with two dark brown lines.

References

Moths described in 1995
Mustilia